Ivanovsky District is an administrative and municipal district (raion), one of the twenty-one in Ivanovo Oblast, Russia. It is located in the center of the oblast. Its administrative center is the city of Ivanovo (which is not administratively a part of the district). Population:   64,270 (2002 Census);

Administrative and municipal status
Within the framework of administrative divisions, Ivanovsky District is one of the twenty-one in the oblast. The city of Ivanovo serves as its administrative center, despite being incorporated separately as an administrative unit with the status equal to that of the districts.

As a municipal division, the district is incorporated as Ivanovsky Municipal District. The City of Ivanovo is incorporated separately from the district as Ivanovo Urban Okrug.

References

Notes

Sources

Districts of Ivanovo Oblast
